Warren J. Rees (August 2, 1908 – 1988) was a justice of the Iowa Supreme Court from November 13, 1969, to August 2, 1980, appointed from Jones County, Iowa.

External links

References

Justices of the Iowa Supreme Court
1908 births
1988 deaths
20th-century American judges